Aleš Furch (born December 24, 1997) is a Czech professional ice hockey centre. He is currently playing with HC Slovan Ústečtí Lvi of the 2nd Czech Republic Hockey League.

Furch previously played one game in the Czech Extraliga with HC Slavia Praha during the 2014–15 Czech Extraliga season.

References

External links

1997 births
Living people
Czech ice hockey centres
KLH Vajgar Jindřichův Hradec players
HC Kobra Praha players
HC Slavia Praha players
HC Slovan Ústečtí Lvi players
Ice hockey people from Prague
Czech expatriate ice hockey players in Germany